William Ewing Beard (July 12, 1873 – December 21, 1950) was a college football player, soldier, journalist, war correspondent, naval historian, and long-time officer of the Tennessee Historical Commission and member of the Tennessee Historical Society.  He wrote several books on Nashville and dubbed Vanderbilt University the Commodores.

Early years
Beard was born on July 12, 1873 in Estill Springs, Tennessee to Richard Beard, a Confederate captain, and Marie Dromgoole, of Estill Springs, Tennessee. He attended Vanderbilt from 1890 to 1893. In 1892 Beard was the first Vanderbilt quarterback to play Tennessee.

Writer
Beard joined the staff of the Nashville American in 1896. In 1897 he was the first to dub Vanderbilt the Commodores. While at the American, Beard employed former Vandy player Bob Blake.

Beard became the state news editor of the Banner in 1910, promoted to associated editor in 1933.

Bibliography

References

External links

1873 births
1950 deaths
American football quarterbacks
Vanderbilt Commodores football players
Players of American football from Tennessee
Naval historians
American male journalists
19th-century players of American football
People from Franklin County, Tennessee